Barnaba de Molina (died 1462) was a Roman Catholic prelate who served as Bishop of Muro Lucano (1443–1462).

Biography
On 26 August 1443, Barnaba de Molina was appointed during the papacy of Pope Eugene IV as Bishop of Muro Lucano.
He served as Bishop of Muro Lucano until his death in 1462.

References

External links and additional sources
 (for Chronology of Bishops) 
 (for Chronology of Bishops) 

15th-century Italian Roman Catholic bishops
Bishops appointed by Pope Eugene IV
1462 deaths